Sonoma Raceway (originally known as Sears Point Raceway from 1967 to 1980 and 1982 to 2002, Golden State International Raceway in 1981 and Infineon Raceway from 2002 to 2012) is a road course and dragstrip located at Sears Point in the southern Sonoma Mountains of Sonoma County, California. It is host to one of the few NASCAR Cup Series races each year that are run on road courses. It has also played host to the IndyCar Series, the NHRA Camping World Drag Racing Series, and several other auto races and motorcycle races such as the American Federation of Motorcyclists series. Sonoma Raceway continues to host amateur, or club racing events with some open to the public. The largest such car club is the Sports Car Club of America.

With the closure of Riverside International Raceway in Moreno Valley, California after the 1988 season, NASCAR wanted a West Coast road course event to replace it, and chose the Sears Point facility. Riverside Raceway was razed for the Moreno Valley Mall.

In 2002, Sears Point Raceway was renamed after a corporate sponsor, Infineon Technologies. On March 7, 2012, it was announced that Infineon would not renew their contract for naming rights when the deal expired in May 2012.

History

1968–1979
The two conceived of the idea of a race track while on a hunting trip. Ground was broken in August 1968 and paving of the race surface was completed in November. The first official event at Sears Point was an SCCA Enduro, held on December 1, 1968.

In 1969 the track was sold to Filmways Corp., a Los Angeles-based entertainment company for $4.5 million. In May 1970 the track was closed and became a tax shelter for Filmways after losses of $300,000 were reported. Hugh Harn of Belvedere and Parker Archer of Napa arranged to lease the track from Filmways in 1973. Bob Bondurant, owner and operator of the Bob Bondurant School of High Performance Driving, and partner Bill Benck took over management and control of the leased raceway from Parker Archer and Hugh Harn in 1974. A few years later a group calling itself Black Mountain Inc., which included Bondurant, William J. Kolb of Del Mar and Howard Meister of Newport Beach, purchased the track from Filmways for a reported $1.5 million.

American Motorcycle Association national motocross races in the hills north of Turn 7 became popular with Bay Area fans, but were phased out by the end of the decade because of rising insurance costs.

1980–2000
In 1981 Filmways regained ownership of the track after a financial dispute with Black Mountain group. Jack Williams, the 1964 NHRA top-fuel drag racing champion, Rick Betts and John Andersen purchased the track from Filmways at an auction for $800,000. The track was renamed Sears Point International Raceway. In 1985 the track was completely repaved, in part with funds donated from the "Pave the Point" fund raising campaign. The first shop spaces (buildings A, B, C, and D in the main paddock area) were built.

In 1986 Harvey "Skip" Berg of Tiburon, CA took control of the track and became a major stockholder in Brenda Raceway Corp., which controlled the track until 1996. Additional buildings constructed on the property brought shop space to more than  during 1987. In addition, a five-year contract was signed with the National Hot Rod Association for the California Nationals. The NASCAR Winston Cup Series debuted at the raceway in 1989.

In 1994 more than $1 million was spent on a beautification project and construction of a -high, four-sided electronic lap leader board in the center of the road course. In the following years a major $3 million renovation plan included VIP suites and a two-story driver's lounge/emergency medical facility. In 1995 Trans-Am and SportsCar races returned to Sears Point and the NASCAR Craftsman Truck Series was added to the major-events schedule. Owner "Skip" Berg sold the track to O. Bruton Smith, chairman of Speedway Motorsports, Inc. in November 1996.

The first-ever running of the American Le Mans Series took place at Sears Point in July 1999. In 2000 Sears Point Raceway gained unanimous approval from the Sonoma County Board of Supervisors by a 5–0 vote to begin work on a $35 million Modernization Plan that included 64,000 Hillside Terrace seats, repaving of both the road course and drag strip and increased run-off around the entire track.

Since 2000

After the turn of the millennium, Infineon Technologies bought the naming rights, and on June 22, 2002, the course was renamed Infineon Raceway. In 2006, the Grand Prix of Sonoma was transferred to the Rolex Sports Car Series, who would limit it to Daytona Prototypes only for 2007–2008 before the event was discontinued altogether. Since 2010, however, the course has seen a mild resurgence, with the circuit becoming a sponsor for various events as well as hosting an increasing amount of lesser series, including the WTCC and the return of the SCCA World Challenge. The year 2012 saw the end of Infineon as the corporate sponsor, with the track renaming itself Sonoma Raceway.

Layouts

Full circuit

The standard, full length road course at Sonoma Raceway is a  12-turn course. This course was utilized by all competition through 1997. Most races, including the Grand Prix of Sonoma, use the full course. The course is noted for turns two and three, which are negative-camber ("off-camber") turns, with the inside of the turn higher than the outside. This provides a challenge for the driver, as turn two would normally have the drivers moving to the left side of the track.

The raceway also has a  dragstrip used for NHRA drag racing events. The drag strip was originally located on part of the front straightaway of the course. Track changes completed in 2002 separated the road course from the drag strip.

The Sonoma Historic Motorsports Festival, an annual classic car racing event, uses the full circuit.

NASCAR returned to using the full circuit in 2019 as a part of the tracks 50th anniversary. The full circuit was used in 2019 & 2021 (event was cancelled in 2020 due to the pandemic), but in 2022 they will return to the modified layout instead of running the original.

The track was closed in 2020 because of government regulations as a result of the COVID-19 pandemic. All national events were removed from the schedule.

The Chute

The Chute was only used for NASCAR events such as the Toyota/Save Mart 350, and was criticized by many drivers, who prefer the full layout.

The Chute was built primarily for spectator visibility, to increase speeds, and improve competition for the stock cars, which are not necessarily groomed well for road course racing. However, it has been criticized for taking away a primary passing point, and some INDYCAR drivers believe eliminating the Chute and replacing it with a new hairpin at Turn 4A, then rejoining the track at Turn 5, would create a circuit with three passing zones (Turn 4, Turn 7, and Turn 11). Furthermore, the speeds of the current layout with the Chute have been slower than if the full configuration was used.

The layout is now used as a Club circuit with options, as at the end of 2018 season, NASCAR returned to the full circuit in 2019. In 2022, NASCAR will be returning to The Chute layout.

Gilligan's Island
From 1989 to 2001, the pit road could only accommodate 34 pit stalls. So, during the Toyota/Save Mart 350 Cup Series race, some teams were required to share pit stalls while other teams were forced to pit inside the garage area. When cars dropped out of the race, their pit stalls were reassigned to cars who were sharing.

After a few years, a makeshift auxiliary pit road was constructed inside the hairpin (turn 11) nicknamed Gilligan's Island. Cars that had the nine slowest qualifying speeds were relegated to these pit stalls. Pitting in this area was considered an inconvenience and a competitive disadvantage, more so than even the disadvantages one would experience pitting on the backstretch at a short track at the time.

Since the length of the auxiliary pit road was significantly shorter than the main pit road, the cars that pitted there were held from 15 to 20 seconds to make up for the time that would have been spent if the cars had traveled the entire main pit road.

Pitting on Gilligan's Island had several other inconveniences. The location (the staging area for drag races) was landlocked by the race course, and crew members were unable to leave once the race began. Teams sent only the primary pit crew to Gilligan's Island, and once they were there, they could not access the garage area or their transporters to collect spare parts/tools. The only repairs that could be made were routine tire changes and refueling, as well as only minor repairs. Other auxiliary pit crew members, who were not part of the main crew, were staged in the garage area, and would have to service the car if it required major repairs. If a team pitting on Gilligan's Island dropped out of the race, the crew was unable to pack up their supplies and prepare to leave (a common practice at other tracks) until the race was over.

Modified course

Variations of Sonoma's circuits are often used. It is based on the full layout, and does not include the Chute. This layout, opened in 2003, skips the later section of the Esses (8A and 9) and the run from Turn 10 to Turn 11 (the hairpin), using instead Turn 11a as Turn 11 has no runoff. This hairpin is located just past the drag strip control tower and offers a fairly straight run to the start-finish line. It was used by INDYCAR from 2006 to 2011.

Another factor in removing the hairpin is the fact that the turn is only visible from the garages or the bleachers behind the esses. This is due to grandstands built along the front straight that serve also as the drag strip's grandstands.

The official FIA Grade 2 variant, the Grand Prix layout, was used by INDYCAR from 2012 to 2018 and others. This version uses the end of the dragstrip (instead of the Keyhole) to create a Magny Cours-style hairpin that joints the drag strip to Turn 7 to open an overtaking opportunity.

During the World Touring Car races, the course used most of the Grand Prix layout except for the full Turn 11 hairpin.

All-Time Lap Records

NOTE: NASCAR records based on full course.

NASCAR Cup Series records

(As of May 8, 2017)

Race Lap Records

The fastest official all-time track record set during a race weekend on the original Long Grand Prix Road Course is 1:20.683, set by Allan McNish in an Audi R8 during qualifying for the 2000 Grand Prix of Sonoma. As of June 2022, the fastest official race lap records at Sonoma Raceway for different classes are listed as:

Seating capacity

Sonoma Raceway has a permanent seating capacity of 47,000. This includes the grandstands and terraces around the track. During major races, hospitality tents and other stages are erected around the track, which brings the total capacity up to 102,000 seats. The facility underwent a major expansion in 2004 which resulted in 64,000 hillside seats, 10,000 permanent grandstand seats, a wastewater treatment facility,  of restored wetlands, permanent garages, new retail space, a go-kart track and a new drag strip.

Current series
Sonoma Drift Series
NASCAR Cup Series
NHRA
Formula Car Challenge
GT World Challenge America
ARCA Menards Series West
Ferrari Challenge
24 Hours of LeMons
San Francisco Region SCCA
National Auto Sport Association
ChampCar Endurance Series
NASCAR Xfinity Series
Trans Am Series

Former series
Grand Am (2006–2008)
IndyCar Series (1970, 2005–2018)
American Le Mans Series (1999–2005)
IMSA GT Series (1976–1997)
Can Am Series (1977, 1980, 1984)
MotoAmerica (1977–1979, 1982–1988, 1993–1999, 2001–2012, 2017–2019)
Formula 5000 (1969–1970)
World Touring Car Championship FIA WTCC Race of the United States (2012–2013)

NHRA Drag Racing Series

Trans-Am Series

In popular culture
In the 1970 motorcycle road racing film Little Fauss and Big Halsy, starring Michael J. Pollard and Robert Redford, Redford's character, Halsy, saw Sears Point as the brass ring in the world of racing, and the film was loosely based around that idea.

Sonoma has been featured in many racing video games, beginning with Papyrus's NASCAR Racing for the PC, released in 1994 and has been a frequent addition to NASCAR based games and more recently road course variations have appeared. Bill Elliott's NASCAR Challenge included the course released in 1991. It appeared in Gran Turismo 4, and Need For Speed ProStreet as Infineon Raceway, and more recently in Project CARS 2 and recent Forza Motorsport titles. It has also been digitally scanned and used in iRacing.

Scenes from a Toyota/Save Mart 350 NASCAR race were used in the softcore porn series Hotel Erotica in Season 1 Episode 3 The Fast and the Curious

See also
Napa Sonoma Marsh
Tolay Creek
Tolay Lake

References

External links

Sonoma Raceway Official Site

Map and circuit history at RacingCircuits.info
Trackpedia guide for this track
High Resolution image from Google Maps
History of raceway

Sports venues in Sonoma County, California
NHRA Division 7 drag racing venues
IndyCar Series tracks
NASCAR tracks
NASCAR races at Sonoma Raceway
Motorsport venues in California
American Le Mans Series circuits
IMSA GT Championship circuits
World Touring Car Championship circuits
Buildings and structures in Sonoma, California
1968 establishments in California
Sports venues completed in 1968